Graham Stilwell (15 November 1945 – 31 January 2019) was a professional tennis player from the United Kingdom. He was born in Denham, Buckinghamshire, England.

Stilwell enjoyed most of his tennis success while playing doubles.  During his career he won three doubles titles, two of which were in the Open Era.

Personal life and death

Stilwell had three children (Tiffany, Alex and Lara) in his first marriage to Robin Lockard. His second marriage to Jill Jacobs resulted in two children (Sam and Romy).

He died of a neuro-muscular disorder on 31 January 2019.

Career finals

Doubles (2 titles, 4 runner-ups)

References

External links
 
 

English male tennis players
People from Denham, Buckinghamshire
1945 births
2019 deaths
People educated at Parmiter's School, London
Tennis people from Buckinghamshire
Grand Slam (tennis) champions in boys' doubles
Australian Championships (tennis) junior champions
British male tennis players